The 2012 Catalan regional election was held on Sunday, 25 November 2012, to elect the 10th Parliament of the autonomous community of Catalonia. All 135 seats in the Parliament were up for election. It was a snap election, announced on 25 September by President Artur Mas following the pro-independence demonstration in Barcelona on 11 September—the National Day of Catalonia—and the failed talks between President Mas and Prime Minister Mariano Rajoy to give greater fiscal autonomy to Catalonia.

Despite Artur Mas campaigning to win an absolute majority of seats, Convergence and Union (CiU) suffered an electoral setback which had gone largely unnoticed by opinion polls. The Socialists' Party of Catalonia (PSC) also fared poorly, obtaining fewer seats than pro-independence Republican Left of Catalonia (ERC) and ending up as the third parliamentary force overall. In turn, ERC regained much of the strength it had loss in the 2010 election and became the main parliamentary opposition party for the first time. The People's Party (PP) and Citizens (C's) benefitted from the electoral polarization between the pro-independence and anti-independence blocs, scoring their best results until then, with 19 and 9 seats, respectively. The Popular Unity Candidacy (CUP) also entered the Parliament for the first time.

Overview

Electoral system
The Parliament of Catalonia was the devolved, unicameral legislature of the autonomous community of Catalonia, having legislative power in regional matters as defined by the Spanish Constitution and the Catalan Statute of Autonomy, as well as the ability to vote confidence in or withdraw it from a regional president.

As a result of no regional electoral law having been approved since the re-establishment of Catalan autonomy, the electoral procedure came regulated under Transitory Provision Fourth of the 1979 Statute, supplemented by the provisions within the Organic Law of General Electoral Regime. Voting for the Parliament was on the basis of universal suffrage, which comprised all nationals over 18 years of age, registered in Catalonia and in full enjoyment of their political rights. Amendments to the electoral law in 2011 required for Catalans abroad to apply for voting before being permitted to vote, a system known as "begged" or expat vote. The 135 members of the Parliament of Catalonia were elected using the D'Hondt method and a closed list proportional representation, with an electoral threshold of three percent of valid votes—which included blank ballots—being applied in each constituency. Seats were allocated to constituencies, corresponding to the provinces of Barcelona, Girona, Lleida and Tarragona, with each being allocated a fixed number of seats.

The use of the D'Hondt method might result in a higher effective threshold, depending on the district magnitude.

Election date
The term of the Parliament of Catalonia expired four years after the date of its previous election, unless it was dissolved earlier. The regional president was required to call an election fifteen days prior to the date of expiry of parliament, with election day taking place within from forty to sixty days after the call. The previous election was held on 28 November 2010, which meant that the legislature's term would have expired on 28 November 2014. The election was required to be called no later than 13 November 2014, with it taking place up to the sixtieth day from the call, setting the latest possible election date for the Parliament on Monday, 12 January 2015.

The president had the prerogative to dissolve the Parliament of Catalonia and call a snap election, provided that no motion of no confidence was in process and that dissolution did not occur before one year had elapsed since a previous one under this procedure. In the event of an investiture process failing to elect a regional president within a two-month period from the first ballot, the Parliament was to be automatically dissolved and a fresh election called.

Background
In the 2010 election, Convergence and Union (CiU) was returned to power after 7 years in opposition, as a result of the electoral collapse of all three parties comprising the "Catalan tripartite" government (Socialists' Party of Catalonia (PSC), Republican Left of Catalonia (ERC) and Initiative for Catalonia Greens (ICV). Newly-elected Catalan president Artur Mas was able to govern comfortably thanks to his party's large parliamentary representation allowing for punctual support of several parties on different issues, in what was known as a policy of "variable geometry". In 2011, CiU signed several agreements with the People's Party (PP) in order to pass the 2011 and 2012 budgets, as well as for the approval of several spending cuts. In spite of this, the relationship between both parties quickly deteriorated after the 2011 general election, as a result of Mas asking new Spanish prime minister Mariano Rajoy for greater fiscal autonomy for Catalonia.

On 11 September 2012, a massive pro-independence demonstration marked the Catalan political agenda and re-opened the debate about the right to hold a referendum on the independence of Catalonia, as well as the debate about the feasibility of an independent Catalan state and its integration into the European Union. On 25 September 2012, President Artur Mas announced a snap regional election to be held on 25 November and argued, referring to the demonstration, that "this election will not be held to help a party to perpetuate itself in power. It will be held so that the whole of the Catalan population decides democratically and peacefully what will their future be as a nation." President Mas signed the decree to officially call the Catalan election on 1 October. Mas' move was criticized as an attempt to try to funnel the popular support for independence seen in the September demonstration into an absolute majority of seats in the election.

Parliamentary composition
The Parliament of Catalonia was officially dissolved on 2 October 2012, after the publication of the dissolution decree in the Official Journal of the Government of Catalonia. The table below shows the composition of the parliamentary groups in the chamber at the time of dissolution.

Parties and candidates
The electoral law allowed for parties and federations registered in the interior ministry, coalitions and groupings of electors to present lists of candidates. Parties and federations intending to form a coalition ahead of an election were required to inform the relevant Electoral Commission within ten days of the election call, whereas groupings of electors needed to secure the signature of at least one percent of the electorate in the constituencies for which they sought election, disallowing electors from signing for more than one list of candidates.

Below is a list of the main parties and electoral alliances which contested the election:

Opinion polls
The tables below list opinion polling results in reverse chronological order, showing the most recent first and using the dates when the survey fieldwork was done, as opposed to the date of publication. Where the fieldwork dates are unknown, the date of publication is given instead. The highest percentage figure in each polling survey is displayed with its background shaded in the leading party's colour. If a tie ensues, this is applied to the figures with the highest percentages. The "Lead" column on the right shows the percentage-point difference between the parties with the highest percentages in a poll.

Graphical summary

Voting intention estimates
The table below lists weighted voting intention estimates. Refusals are generally excluded from the party vote percentages, while question wording and the treatment of "don't know" responses and those not intending to vote may vary between polling organisations. When available, seat projections determined by the polling organisations are displayed below (or in place of) the percentages in a smaller font; 68 seats were required for an absolute majority in the Parliament of Catalonia.

Results

Overall

Distribution by constituency

Aftermath

Notes

References
Opinion poll sources

Other

Catalonia
Regional elections in Catalonia
regional election
Catalan regional election